Black Creek is a town in Outagamie County, Wisconsin, United States. The population was 1,251 at the 2020 census. The Village of Black Creek (governed separately) and the unincorporated community of Binghamton are located in the town. The unincorporated community of Five Corners is also located partially in the town.

History
In November 1861, petitioners requested a new town, Black Creek, be established and separated from the existing town of Center. The Outagamie county board approved and made this final in March 1862; officers were elected in April.

Geography

The town of Black Creek is located at (44.458889, −88.439722). According to the United States Census Bureau, the town has a total area of 34.8 square miles (90 km2), all of it land.

Demographics

As of the census of 2010, there were 1,259 people, 487 households, and 469 families residing in the town. The population density was 36.9 people per square mile (14.0/km2). There were 487 housing units at an average density of 14.10 per square mile (5.4/km2). The racial makeup of the town was 97.00% White, ???% Native American, 0.66% Asian, 0.2% African American, 0.6% from other races, and 2.04% from two or more races. 0.39% of the population were Hispanic or Latino of any race.

There were 469 occupied households, out of which 11.59% had children under the age of 18 living with them.

In the town, the population was spread out, with 23.98% under the age of 18, 76% were over the age of 18, 4.28% from 20 to 24, 8.74% from 25 to 34, 24.78% from 35 to 49, 22.56% from 50 to 64, and 12.71% who were 65 years of age or older. For every 100 females, there were 108.8 males.

The median income for a household in the town was $53,472, and the median income for a family was $59,196. Males had a median income of $37,188 versus $25,096 for females. The per capita income for the town was $20,481. About 5.9% of families and 6.1% of the population were below the poverty line, including 7.3% of those under age 18 and 4.5% of those age 65 or over.

Education
Students in the Town of Black Creek are served by the school in the Village of Black Creek, Black Creek Elementary & Middle School, which is part of the Seymour Community School District. Part of the town is also served by the Shiocton School District.

Transportation

Recreation
Fallen Timbers Environmental Center
Newton Blackmour State Trail
The Meadows Trails
Town Hall Park

References

Images

External links
 Black Creek Elemmentary/Middle School website
 Official Town Website
 Black Creek Village Library
 The Newton Blackmour State Trail

Towns in Outagamie County, Wisconsin
Towns in Wisconsin